Loretto Academy is a private Roman Catholic school in El Paso, Texas. It was opened in 1923 and was founded by Mother M. Praxedes Carty. is a part of the Roman Catholic Diocese of El Paso. Grades Pre-K3-5 are coeducational, while grades 6-12 are all girls.

Background
The Sisters of Loretto had previously established several schools in Las Cruces and El Paso. In the early 1920s, Mother M. Praxedes Carty of the Sisters of Loretto came to El Paso to establish a new school. On March 20, 1922, she purchased 19 acres of land in the Austin Terrace area, which was considered a bad place to put the school. The area was open desert on a hilltop and was accessible by streetcar. For the time period, it was considered to be a long distance from the downtown area. Because of the location, people were unsure if parents would send their children to the school. People began to call the project "Praxedes' Folly."

The building was designed by Trost & Trost. Gustavus A. Trost was friends with Mother Praxedes and may have done most of the primary architectural drawings. The buildings were "designed to face Mexico" in a welcoming gesture for all people to join the community. They were built using stuccoed brick and red Spanish tile on the roof. The first building was started in the fall of 1922. The cornerstone for the chapel was laid down on March 20, 1924. The entire campus was not complete until the 1930s. However, the first school building was ready in 1923. Loretto Academy in El Paso opened on September 11, 1923 with 186 students, of which 20 lived at the school as boarders. In 1928, the Southern Association of Colleges and Secondary Schools admitted Loretto as a member.

The boarding school closed in 1975. Students from Ciudad Juarez also attend the school. As of the early 1990s the school had over 900 students.

After 22 years, in 2022, Sister Mary E. "Buffy" Boesen stepped down as president of Loretto. Loretto alumna, Nicole Ortega Cobb, became the next president of the school in June of 2022.

Notable attendees 

 Stevie Nicks.
 Maureen McDonnell.
 Karla Martínez de Salas.
 Amirah Kassem.
 Michelle Dipp.
 Mago Orona Gándara.
 Mary Helen Garcia.
 Alicia Gaspar de Alba.
 M. Sue Kurita.
 Pat Mora.
 María Guillermina Valdes Villalva.
 Patricia Roybal Caballero.
 Andi Teran, author.
 Veronica Escobar.

Notable faculty 

 Lilliana Owens.
 Jacqueline Grennan Wexler.

Notes and references

Sources

External links

 School Website
 "Sisters of Loretto Have Long Tradition in Southwest". Borderlands article.
 "Early History".
 God's Own Frontier

Catholic secondary schools in Texas
Educational institutions established in 1923
High schools in El Paso, Texas
Private K-12 schools in Texas
El Paso
Girls' schools in Texas
Trost & Trost buildings
History of women in Texas
1923 establishments in Texas